Yaylayurt is a village in Dikili district of İzmir Province, Turkey. It is situated to the north of Gulf of Çandarlı . The population of Esentepe was  400 as of 2011  as of 2011.

References

Villages in Dikili District